Klaudia Kaczorowska (born 20 December 1988) is a Polish volleyball player, a member of Poland women's national volleyball team and Polish club PGE Atom Trefl Sopot, bronze medalist of European Championship 2009, and Polish Champion (2011, 2013).

Career
In 2012, Kaczorowska went to Polish club Atom Trefl Sopot. On March 15, 2015 she achieved with the team from Sopot the Polish Cup 2015. In May 2015 she signed a new contract with her current team.

Sporting achievements

Clubs

CEV Cup
  2014/2015 - with PGE Atom Trefl Sopot

National championships
 2007/2008  Polish Cup, with PTPS Farmutil Piła
 2007/2008  Polish Championship, with PTPS Farmutil Piła
 2008/2009  Polish SuperCup 2008, with PTPS Farmutil Piła
 2008/2009  Polish Championship, with PTPS Farmutil Piła
 2010/2011  Polish Cup, with Bank BPS Muszynianka Fakro Muszyna
 2010/2011  Polish Championship, with Bank BPS Muszynianka Fakro Muszyna
 2012/2013  Polish Championship, with PGE Atom Trefl Sopot
 2013/2014  Polish Championship, with PGE Atom Trefl Sopot
 2014/2015  Polish Cup, with PGE Atom Trefl Sopot

National team
 2009  Universiade
 2009  CEV European Championship
 2014  European League

Individually
 2008 Polish Cup - Best Server
 2015 Polish Cup - Best Server
 2015 Polish Cup - Most Valuable Player

References

External links
 FIVB profile
 ORLENLiga player profile

1988 births
Living people
People from Czarnków-Trzcianka County
Sportspeople from Greater Poland Voivodeship
Polish women's volleyball players
Universiade medalists in volleyball
Universiade bronze medalists for Poland
Medalists at the 2009 Summer Universiade